Igor Armaș (born 14 July 1987) is a Moldovan footballer who plays as a centre-back for Liga I club FC Voluntari, which he captains. He played for the Moldova national team.

Career
After a successful season in FC Zimbru, Armaș signed a four-year contract with Swedish club Hammarby IF.

In November 2009 he was elected the club's Player of the year by the fans on Hammarby's official website.

In January 2010, Armaș signed for Russian club, Kuban Krasnodar. In the 2013–14 season, Armaș played in the group stage of the UEFA Europe League. He made two assists in a match against St. Gallen. During WCQ with the Republic of Ireland Armaș suffered a fractured leg.

In March 2023, Armaș annouced his retirment from Moldova national football team.

Career statistics

Club

Notes

International

Scores and results list Moldova's goal tally first

Honours
Zimbru 2 Chișinău
Divizia "A": 2005–06, 2006–07 

Zimbru Chișinău
Moldovan Cup: 2006–07
Moldovan Super Cup runner-up: 2007

Kuban Krasnodar
Russian First Division: 2010
Russian Cup runner-up: 2014–15

FC Voluntari
Cupa României runner-up: 2021–22

References

External links

1987 births
Living people
Footballers from Chișinău
Moldovan people of Romanian descent
Moldovan footballers
Moldova international footballers
Association football defenders
Moldovan Super Liga players
FC Zimbru Chișinău players
Allsvenskan players
Hammarby Fotboll players
Russian Premier League players
FC Kuban Krasnodar players
FC Anzhi Makhachkala players
Liga I players
FC Voluntari players
Moldovan expatriate footballers
Moldovan expatriate sportspeople in Sweden
Expatriate footballers in Sweden
Moldovan expatriate sportspeople in Russia
Expatriate footballers in Russia
Moldovan expatriate sportspeople in Romania
Expatriate footballers in Romania